Susan Carol Shadburne (December 16, 1942April 24, 2018) was an American screenwriter, director, producer, and filmmaker, best known for her collaborations with her husband, claymation animator Will Vinton. She wrote the screenplay for The Adventures of Mark Twain (1985), directed by Vinton, and wrote and directed the supernatural thriller film Shadow Play (1986). In addition to feature films, Shadburne wrote and directed several short films. Two of the short films Shadburne wrote that Vinton directed—Rip Van Winkle (1978) and The Great Cognito (1983) –were nominated for the Academy Award for Best Animated Short Film.

Biography
Shadburne was born and raised in Portland, Oregon, and graduated from Lincoln High School in 1960. She later attended Stanford University.

Shadburne began writing films in 1978 while married to animator Will Vinton, first a documentary short about Vinton's filmmaking process titled Claymation: Three Dimensional Clay Animation. She subsequently wrote the screenplay for Vinton's short film Rip Van Winkle (1978), which was nominated for the Academy Award for Best Animated Short Film. In 1982, she again wrote the screenplay for Vinton's short The Great Cognito, which was again nominated for the Academy Award for Best Animated Short Film.

She collaborated with Vinton on the 1985 animated feature The Adventures of Mark Twain. Shadburne researched Mark Twain extensively while writing the screenplay, adapting it from his autobiography and integrating direct quotes from him into the dialogue. The following year, she wrote, produced, and directed the supernatural thriller film Shadow Play (1986) starring Dee Wallace and Cloris Leachman.

In her later life, Shadburne worked as a medical intuitive and energy healer.

Death
Shadburne died on April 24, 2018, in Vancouver, Washington, aged 75, after a decades-long battle with multiple sclerosis.

Filmography

Accolades

References

Sources

External links

1942 births
2018 deaths
American women film directors
American women film producers
American women screenwriters
Filmmakers from Portland, Oregon
Lincoln High School (Portland, Oregon) alumni
Stanford University alumni
People with multiple sclerosis
Writers from Portland, Oregon
21st-century American women